The 1891 Trinity Blue and White football team represented Trinity College (today known as Duke University) in the 1891 college football season. The team went 3–0  and beat its opponents by a combined score of 122 to 4. The team claimed a Southern championship.

The 1891 team was led by senior player and captain Tom Daniels, who later played for Auburn University.

Schedule

References

Trinity
Duke Blue Devils football seasons
College football undefeated seasons
Trinity Blue and White football